Nakasero is a hill and neighborhood in the centre of Kampala, the capital and largest city of Uganda. Nakasero is important to Uganda's economy and politics, as it is home to Kampala's central business district and several government offices, including the Ugandan Parliament Buildings.

Location
Nakasero is bordered by Mulago to the north, Makerere to the northwest, Old Kampala to the west, Namirembe and Mengo to the southwest, Nsambya to the south, Kibuli to the southeast, and Kololo to the east. The coordinates of Nakasero Hill are 0°19'24.0"N, 32°34'44.0"E (Latitude:0.323334; Longitude:32.578890).

Overview
Nakasero Hill is the location of the central business district of Kampala, whose nighttime population was estimated at 1,680,600 as of July 2020.

The lower reaches of the western and southern slopes of the hill accommodate the ordinary business and commercial activities of the city (taxi parks, train station, shopping arcades, banks, and restaurants). Towards the top of the hill, there are government buildings including the Uganda Parliament Buildings, several government ministries and the Kampala Capital City Authority Building Complex.

The top of Nakasero Hill is one of the most luxurious address in the city and accommodates the most upscale hotels and restaurants in Kampala and the country. The Kampala State House is also located here. The northern and eastern slopes of Nakasero Hill house many of the diplomatic missions to Uganda and the residences of many ambassadors accredited to Uganda.

Landmarks
The numerous landmarks in Kampala's central business district, located on Nakasero hill, include but are not limited to the following:

Government buildings
 Uganda Parliament Buildings
 State House, Kampala
 Headquarters of Bank of Uganda
 Headquarters of Uganda Wildlife Authority
 Uganda Bureau of Statistics
 Uganda Commercial Court Building Complex
 Uganda Government Analytical Chemistry Laboratory
 Uganda High Court
 Uganda Investment Authority
 Uganda Ministry of Finance, Planning & Economic Development
 Uganda Ministry of Foreign Affairs
 Uganda Ministry of Health
 Uganda Ministry of Internal Affairs
 Uganda Ministry of Tourism, Trade and Industry

Banking institutions
Nearly all commercial banks and the three development banks in Uganda maintain their headquarters and main branches in Nakasero.

 Headquarters of ABC Bank (Uganda)
 Headquarters of Absa Bank Uganda
 Headquarters of Afriland First Bank
Uganda Limited
 Headquarters of Bank of Africa (Uganda)
 Headquarters of Bank of Baroda (Uganda)
 Headquarters of Bank of India (Uganda)
 Headquarters of Cairo Bank Uganda
 Headquarters of Centenary Bank
 Headquarters of Citibank Uganda
 Headquarters of DFCU Bank
 Headquarters of Diamond Trust Bank (Uganda) Limited
 Headquarters of Ecobank (Uganda)
 Headquarters of Equity Bank (Uganda)
 Headquarters of Guaranty Trust Bank (Uganda)
 Headquarters of Kenya Commercial Bank (Uganda)
 Headquarters of NCBA Bank Uganda
 Headquarters of Orient Bank - A member of the I&M Bank Group
 Headquarters of PostBank Uganda
 Headquarters of Stanbic Bank (Uganda) Limited
 Headquarters of Standard Chartered Uganda
 Headquarters of Tropical Bank
 Headquarters of Uganda Development Bank
 Headquarters of United Bank for Africa (Uganda)
 Headquarters of East African Development Bank
 Headquarters of Uganda Development Bank
 Regional Office (Eastern Africa) of African Export–Import Bank

Hotels, clubs, and casinos
 Grand Imperial Hotel
 Fairway Hotel & Spa
 Imperial Royale Hotel
 The Pearl of Africa Hotel Kampala
 Kampala Hilton Hotel
 Kampala Intercontinental Hotel
 Kampala Serena Hotel
 Kampala Sheraton Hotel
 Kampala Speke Hotel

Foreign embassies
The following foreign missions maintain their offices on Nakasero Hill.

 Embassy of Belgium
 Embassy of France
 Embassy of India 
 Embassy of Ireland
 Embassy of Italy
 Embassy of Kenya
 Embassy of Nigeria
 Embassy of Norway
 Embassy of Somalia
 Embassy of South Korea
 Embassy of Spain
 Embassy of Switzerland
 High Commission of Tanzania
 Embassy of United Arab Emirates

Places of worship
 All Saints Cathedral - Anglican
 Watoto Church - Evangelical
 Christ the King Catholic Church - Roman Catholic

Others
 Buganda Road Primary School
 Headquarters of AMREF in Uganda
 Headquarters of UNDP in Uganda
 Kampala Central Police Station
 Kampala Capital City Authority Building Complex
 Kampala Railway Station
 Nakasero Farmers Market
 Uganda Main Post Office
 Uganda National Cultural Center
 Case Medical Centre
 Nakasero Hospital

See also
 Kololo
 Muyenga
 Mengo, Uganda
 Nsambya

References

External links
Nakasero Market, Market Square Road, Nakasero Hill, Kampala, Uganda

Neighborhoods of Kampala
Kampala Central Division